Sanaa Ismail Hamed (born 1984) is a beauty pageant contestant who represented Egypt in Miss World 2008 in South Africa.

External links
www.aipsmedia.com

1984 births
Living people
Miss World 2008 delegates
Egyptian beauty pageant winners
Models from Cairo
Date of birth missing (living people)